Froment is a French surname. Notable people with the surname include:

Antoine Froment, Protestant reformer in Geneva
Jules Froment, French neurologist
Louis de Froment, French orchestral conductor
Nicolas Froment, fifteenth-century French painter
Paul-Gustave Froment, early French electrical engineer
Pierre de Froment, French member of the resistance during World War II and subsequently General
Gilbert Froment, Professor Emeritus of Chemical Engineering at Ghent University, Belgium

French-language surnames